Penicilliopsis is a genus of fungi in the family Aspergillaceae.

Taxonomy 
This genus was created by the German botanist Hermann zu Solms-Laubach in 1887 when he described the type species Penicilliopsis clavariiformis (originally Penicilliopsis clavariaeformis) as new to science. The species was observed growing from the fallen fruit of Diospyros macrophylla in Java.

Species 
As of March 2023, Species Fungorum accepted nine species of Penicilliopsis.

References 

Eurotiales
Eurotiomycetes genera